KIMM may refer to:

 KIMM (AM), a radio station (1150 AM) licensed to Rapid City, South Dakota, United States
 Korea Institute of Machinery & Material, part of the University of Science and Technology (South Korea)
 Original Mountain Marathon (formerly known as the Karrimor International Mountain Marathon)

See also
 Kimm, a surname
 Kim (disambiguation)